Brian James Butterfield (born March 9, 1958) is an American professional baseball coach, and a former minor league player, manager and infield instructor. He has coached for the New York Yankees, Arizona Diamondbacks, Toronto Blue Jays, Boston Red Sox, Chicago Cubs, and Los Angeles Angels of Major League Baseball (MLB).

Early years
Born in Bangor, Maine, Butterfield is the son of the late Jack Butterfield, a longtime college baseball coach who was vice-president of player development and scouting for the New York Yankees from 1977 until his death in November 1979. The younger Butterfield attended the University of Maine, where his father was head baseball coach from 1957 to 1974, and still resides in Orono, Maine.  He also attended Valencia Community College and graduated from Florida Southern College, where he earned a Bachelor of Arts degree in 1980. In 1976, he played collegiate summer baseball for the Wareham Gatemen of the Cape Cod Baseball League, where he helped lead the team to the league title. He is the nephew of College Football Hall of Fame Coach Jim Butterfield.

Playing career
During his active career, Butterfield was a second baseman in the Yankees' minor league system, playing for five seasons (1979–83) and batting .249 with one home run in 397 games played, largely at the full-season Class A level.

Early coaching career
Butterfield's coaching career began during his professional playing days as a part-time assistant at Florida Southern (1979) and Eckerd College (1980–81).  After his playing career ended, he became a roving infield instructor in the Yankees' organization, then a coach at different levels of the Bombers' farm system. He also managed the Short Season-A Oneonta Yankees (1989) and Class A Greensboro Hornets (1990) and Fort Lauderdale Yankees (1992), before joining the Major League staff of Yankees' manager Buck Showalter as first-base coach in 1994–95.

After he was replaced by Joe Torre as the Yankees' pilot after the  season, Showalter was promptly named the first manager of the expansion Arizona Diamondbacks, set to begin play during the  National League season. Hired with two seasons to prepare for the team's debut, Showalter brought several Yankees' instructors with him to Phoenix, including Butterfield, to implement the Diamondbacks' player development program. Butterfield was named roving minor league infield instructor in 1996 and then, in 1997, manager of the D-backs' Rookie-level team, the Arizona League Diamondbacks.  Butterfield then became the first third-base coach in the Diamondbacks' Major League history, serving under Showalter in 1998–2000.

After Showalter's firing following the  season, Butterfield returned to the Yankees as a minor league manager, helming the Tampa Yankees of the Class A Florida State League (2001) and beginning 2002 as manager of the Triple-A Columbus Clippers of the International League.  However, the Clippers got off to a poor, 12–25 start and Butterfield was fired on May 16, 2002.

Less than three weeks later, on June 3, 2002, Carlos Tosca, a coaching colleague of Butterfield's with the Diamondbacks, was appointed manager of the Toronto Blue Jays. He hired Butterfield as his third-base coach, beginning a -year tenure for Butterfield in Toronto.  During that time, Butterfield served under four different Blue Jay managers.

Infield coaching career 
Butterfield has earned a reputation throughout baseball as a premier infield coach. Under Butterfield's tutelage Aaron Hill, a shortstop by trade, became an above-average defensive second baseman. Butterfield worked very closely with the young and talented Blue Jays third baseman Brett Lawrie.

On October 30, 2009, it was announced that Butterfield would once again be the Blue Jays' third base coach for the 2010 season.

When John Gibbons got the Blue Jays' job, Butterfield joined Farrell and the Red Sox on October 30, 2012, as third-base coach. He served through the Red Sox' 2013 World Series championship season, coaching third base, positioning the infielders defensively, working with young players Will Middlebrooks and Xander Bogaerts, and helping to convert Mike Napoli from catcher to first baseman.

Butterfield was hired by the Los Angeles Angels as their third base coach prior to the 2020 season. The Angels dismissed Butterfield after the 2021 season. On January 21, 2022, it was reported that Butterfield was denied a role on the New York Mets staff for his refusal to receive the COVID-19 vaccine.

References

External links

, or Retrosheet

1958 births
Living people
Arizona Diamondbacks coaches
Baseball coaches from Maine
Baseball players from Maine
Boston Red Sox coaches
Chicago Cubs coaches
Columbus Clippers players
Florida Southern Moccasins baseball players
Fort Lauderdale Yankees managers
Fort Lauderdale Yankees players
Greensboro Hornets players
Los Angeles Angels coaches
Maine Black Bears baseball players
Major League Baseball bench coaches
Major League Baseball third base coaches
Miami Marlins (FSL) players
Nashville Sounds players
New York Yankees coaches
Oneonta Yankees players
People from Orono, Maine
Sportspeople from Bangor, Maine
Toronto Blue Jays coaches
Wareham Gatemen players